Aspen Soda was an apple-flavored soft drink sold across the United States by PepsiCo from 1978 until 1982. In 1984, PepsiCo came out with a replacement apple soda under its new Slice line.

See also
 List of defunct consumer brands

References

PepsiCo soft drinks
Apple sodas
Products introduced in 1978
1982 disestablishments
Defunct drink brands